Galina Yahorova Anakhrieva (born 12 March 1967) is a Bulgarian former rower. She competed at the 1988 Summer Olympics and the 1992 Summer Olympics.

References

External links
 

1967 births
Living people
Bulgarian female rowers
Olympic rowers of Bulgaria
Rowers at the 1988 Summer Olympics
Rowers at the 1992 Summer Olympics
Sportspeople from Varna, Bulgaria
20th-century Bulgarian women